Athletes from the Socialist Federal Republic of Yugoslavia competed at the 1988 Summer Olympics in Seoul, South Korea. This was the last time that the SFR Yugoslavia competed in the Summer Olympics. 155 competitors, 117 men and 38 women, took part in 72 events in 18 sports.

Medalists

Competitors
The following is the list of number of competitors in the Games.

Athletics

Men's 400 metres
 Slobodan Branković
 Ismail Mačev

Men's 800 metres
 Slobodan Popović

Men's 1,500 metres
 Branko Zorko

Men's Marathon 
 Mirko Vindiš 
 Final — 2:17:47 (→ 25th place)

Men's 400 metres Hurdles
 Branislav Karaulić  
 Rok Kopitar

Men's 4 × 400 m Relay 
 Branislav Karaulić, Slobodan Popović, Slobodan Branković, and Ismail Mačev 
 Heat — 3:05.62
 Semi Final — 3:01.59 (→ did not advance)

Men's Javelin Throw 
 Sejad Krdžalić 
 Qualification — 79.90 m
 Final — 73.28 m (→ 12th place)

Women's 800 metres
 Slobodanka Čolović

Women's High Jump
 Biljana Petrović

Basketball

Men's tournament

Team roster

Group play

Quarterfinals

Semifinals

Gold medal match

Women's tournament

Team roster

Group play

Semifinals

Gold medal game

Boxing

Men's Featherweight (– 57 kg)
Ljubiša Simić  
First Round — Bye
Second Round — Lost to Mikhail Kazaryan (URS), 0:5

Men's Light-Welterweight (– 63,5 kg)
Vukašin Dobrašinović 
First Round — Defeated Borislav Abadzhiev (BUL), 3:2 
Second Round — Lost to Adrian Carew (GUY), 1:4

Men's Welterweight (– 67 kg)
Đorđe Petronijević 
First Round — Bye
Second Round — Lost to Robert Wangila (KEN), RSC-2

Men's Middleweight (– 75 kg)
Darko Dukić
First Round — Bye
Second Round — Defeated Vili Lesiva (SAM), RSC-2 
Third Round — Lost to Egerton Marcus (CAN), KO-2

Men's Light-Heavyweight (– 81 kg)
Damir Škaro →  Bronze Medal
First Round — Defeated Deyan Kirilov (BUL), 3:2 
Second Round — Defeated Osmond Imadiyi (NGA), 5:0 
Quarterfinals — Defeated Joseph Akhasamba (KEN), 5:0 
Semifinals — Lost to Nuramgomed Shanavazov (URS), walkover

Men's Heavyweight (– 91 kg)
Željko Mavrović
First Round — Bye
Second Round — Lost to Baik Hyun-Man (KOR), 0:5

Men's Super-Heavyweight (+ 91 kg)
Aziz Salihu
First Round — Bye
Second Round — Lost to Ulli Kaden (GDR), 0:5

Canoeing

Men's C-1 500 metres
Ivan Šabjan

C-1 1000 metres
Ivan Šabjan

C-2 1000 metres
Mirko Nišović, Matija Ljubek

Cycling

Six male cyclists represented Yugoslavia in 1988.

Men's road race
 Rajko Čubrić
 Mićo Brković
 Valter Bonča

Men's team time trial
 Valter Bonča
 Sandi Papež
 Robert Šebenik
 Jože Smole

Football

Men's team competition
Preliminary round (group D)
Lost to Australia 0–1
Defeated Nigeria 3-1
Lost to Brazil 1–2 → Finished competition at the group stage.
Team roster
Dragoje Leković
Vujadin Stanojković
Predrag Spasić
Srečko Katanec
Davor Jozić
Dragoljub Brnović
Refik Šabanadžović
Toni Savevski
Ivica Barbarić
Dragan Stojković
Cvijan Milošević
Stevan Stojanović
Duško Milinković
Davor Šuker
Semir Tuce
Vladislav Đukić
Mirko Mihić
Nenad Jakšić
Head coach: Ivica Osim

Gymnastics

Artistic Gymnastics
Men's Individual All-Around
 Jože Kolman

Men's Floor Exercise
 Jože Kolman

Men's Horse Vault
 Jože Kolman

Men's Parallel Bars
 Jože Kolman

Men's Horizontal Bar
 Jože Kolman

Men's Rings
 Jože Kolman

Men's Pommelled Horse
 Jože Kolman

Rhythmic Gymnastics
Women's Individual
 Milena Reljin
 Dara Terzić

Handball

Men's team competition
Preliminary round (group A)
Lost to Soviet Union (18–24)
Defeated United States (31–23)
Defeated Algeria (23–22)
Tied Iceland (19–19)
Defeated Sweden (25–21)
Bronze Medal Match
Defeated Hungary (27–23) →  Bronze Medal
Team roster
Mirko Bašić
Jožef Holpert
Boris Jarak
Slobodan Kuzmanovski
Muhamed Memić
Alvaro Načinović
Goran Perkovac
Zlatko Portner
Iztok Puc
Rolando Pušnik
Momir Rnić
Zlatko Saračević
Irfan Smajlagić
Ermin Velić
Veselin Vujović
Head coach: ???

Women's Team Competition
Team roster
Svetlana Anastasovska
Slavica Đukić
Dragica Đurić
Mirjana Đurica
Zita Galic
Ljubinka Janković
Nataša Kolega
Mirjana Krstić
Ljiljana Marković
Svetlana Mičić
Ljiljana Mugoša
Svetlana Mugoša
Dragana Pešić
Slavica Rinčić
Desanka Stojanović

Judo

Men's Half-Lightweight
 Dragomir Bečanović

Men's Half-Middleweight
 Filip Leščak

Men's Middleweight
 Ivan Todorov

Men's Heavyweight
 Dragomir Kusmuk

Rowing

Men's coxless pair
 Bojan Prešern
 Sadik Mujkič

Men's coxed pair
 Janez Ambrožič
 Milan Janša
 Sašo Mirjanič

Men's coxed four
 Sead Marušić
 Lazo Pivač
 Zlatko Celent
 Vladimir Banjanac
 Darko Varga

Sailing

Division II
 Roland Milošević

Shooting

Men

Women

Swimming

Men's 400 m Freestyle
 Darjan Petrič
 Heat – 3:56.94 (→ did not advance, 20th place)

 Igor Majcen
 Heat – 3:58.90 (→ did not advance, 28th place)

Men's 1500 m Freestyle
 Darjan Petrič
 Heat – 15:16.99
 Final – 15:37.12 (→ 8th place)

 Igor Majcen
 Heat – 15:29.16 (→ did not advance, 18th place)

Women's 200 m Breaststroke
 Anamarija Petričević
 Heat – 2:40.80 (→ did not advance, 32nd place)

Women's 200 m Individual Medley
 Anamarija Petričević
 Heat – 2:19.38
 Final – 2:19.63 (→ 13th place)

Women's 400 m Individual Medley
 Anamarija Petričević
 Heat – 4:54.17 (→ did not advance, 17th place)

Table tennis

Men's Singles Competition
Zoran Primorac
Ilija Lupulesku
Zoran Kalinić

Men's Doubles Competition
Zoran Primorac, Ilija Lupulesku

Women's Singles Competition
Jasna Fazlić
Gordana Perkučin

Women's Doubles Competition
Jasna Fazlić, Gordana Perkučin

Tennis

Men's Singles Competition
Slobodan Živojinović
Goran Ivanišević

Men's Doubles Competition
Slobodan Živojinović, Goran Ivanišević

Women's Singles Competition
Sabrina Goleš
 First Round – Defeated Arantxa Sánchez Vicario (Spain) 6-4, 6–2 
 Second Round – Lost to Gabriela Sabatini (Argentina) 1–6, 0–6

Water polo

Men's Team Competition
 Preliminary round (group B)
 Lost to United States (6–7)
 Defeated Hungary (10–9)
 Defeated Greece (17–7)
 Defeated Spain (10–8)
 Defeated China (17–7)
 Semi Finals
 Defeated West Germany (14–10)
 Final
 Defeated United States (9–7) →  Gold Medal

 Team roster
 Aleksandar Šoštar
 Deni Lusić
 Dubravko Šimenc
 Perica Bukić
 Veselin Đuho
 Dragan Andrić
 Mirko Vičević
 Igor Gočanin
 Mislav Bezmalinović
 Tomislav Paškvalin
 Igor Milanović
 Goran Rađenović
 Renco Posinković
Head coach: Ratko Rudić

Wrestling

Greco-Roman
 Zoran Galović
 Nandor Sabo
 Franc Podlesek
 Goran Kasum
 Bernard Ban
 Jožef Tertei

Men's Freestyle
 Šaban Trstena
 Zoran Šorov
 Šaban Sejdi
 Čedo Nikolovski

References

External links
Official Olympic Reports
International Olympic Committee results database

Nations at the 1988 Summer Olympics
1988
Summer Olympics